Cucuel is a surname. Notable people with the surname include:

Edward Cucuel (1875–1954), American-born, German-based painter 
Léo Cucuel (born 1987), Tahitian coach and badminton player